The 1996 Open Championship was a men's major golf championship and the 125th Open Championship, held from 18–21 July at the Royal Lytham & St Annes Golf Club in Lytham St Annes, England. Tom Lehman won his only major championship by two strokes over runners-up Mark McCumber and Ernie Els. Lehman built a six-stroke lead after 54 holes and became the first American to win at Lytham since Bobby Jones seventy years earlier.

Tiger Woods, age 20, was the only amateur to make the cut and finished tied for 22nd; he turned professional six weeks later. Jack Nicklaus, 56, was one stroke out of the lead after 36 holes, but fell back on the weekend and tied for 45th.

Course layout

Source:

Previous lengths of the course for The Open Championship (since 1950):

Round summaries

First round
Thursday, 18 July 1996

Second round
Friday, 19 July 1996

Amateurs (a): Woods (–1), Bladon (+4), Allan (+5), García (+7).

Third round
Saturday, 20 July 1996

Final round
Sunday, 21 July 1996

Amateurs: Woods (–3).

Source:

References

External links
Royal Lytham & St Annes 1996 (Official site)
125th Open Championship - Royal Lytham & St Annes (European Tour)

The Open Championship
Golf tournaments in England
Open Championship
Open Championship
Open Championship